The slender weasel shark, Paragaleus randalli, is a weasel shark of the family Hemigaleidae. It is found in the western Indian Ocean, off Bahrain. It can grow up to a length of 48 cm.

The slender weasel shark is a harmless Viviparous species, about which little is known.

References 

 

slender weasel shark
Fish of the Indian Ocean
Marine fauna of South Asia
slender weasel shark